Harvest of Hope Fest was a charity fundraiser and music festival that provided financial support for the Harvest of Hope Foundation which benefits migrant and seasonal farmworkers. The three-day event took place in March 2009 and 2010 at the St. Johns County Fairgrounds in St. Augustine, Florida, United States.

History 
The first Harvest of Hope festival was held March 6–8, 2009 in St. Augustine, Florida. The organizers hoped for about 12,000 attendees for the weekend. By the end of the festival, 17,000 people attended the festival. The Harvest of Hope founder, Phillip Kellerman, said that a goal of the foundation is to raise awareness to the huge economic, social and cultural contributions of migrant farmworkers and their families.

The second Harvest of Hope Fest was held March 12–14 in St. Augustine, Florida. It featured the spotlight artist Billy Bragg among other indie artists.

The Harvest of Hope Festival is always held in the spring.

Artists 
The 2009 Fest featured amongst others:
 Against Me!
 Propagandhi
 KRS-One
 Bad Brains
 The Bouncing Souls
 Less Than Jake
 The Gaslight Anthem
 Kool Keith
 Tilly and the Wall
 Bomb the Music Industry!
 Morningbell
 Inspectah Deck
 The National
 Ra Ra Riot
 Broken Social Scene
 Girl Talk
 Strike Anywhere
 Ghost Mice
 This Bike is a Pipe Bomb
 John Vanderslice

The 2010 Fest featured amongst others:
 Billy Bragg
 Anvil
 Anti-Flag
 Chali 2na (of Jurassic 5)
 Stars of Track and Field
 Andrew Jackson Jihad
 Rogue Wave
 Defiance, Ohio
 The Mountain Goats
 Kimya Dawson
 Delta Spirit
 Senses Fail

References

External links 
 Harvest of Hope Fest

Music festivals in Florida
2009 establishments in Florida
2010 disestablishments in Florida
Music festivals established in 2009
Festivals disestablished in 2010
St. Augustine, Florida